Ñuñu Qullu (Aymara ñuñu breast, qullu mountain, "breast mountain", also spelled Nunu Kkollu) is a  mountain in the Andes of Bolivia. It is situated in the Oruro Department, Sajama Province, in the north of the Turco Municipality. Ñuñu Qullu lies south-west of the mountain Yaritani, north-east of the volcanic complex of Asu Asuni and south-east of the mountains Chunkarani, Milluni and Pukarani.

References 

Mountains of Oruro Department